Google Maps is a web mapping platform and consumer application offered by Google. It offers satellite imagery, aerial photography, street maps, 360° interactive panoramic views of streets (Street View), real-time traffic conditions, and route planning for traveling by foot, car, bike, air (in beta) and public transportation. , Google Maps was being used by over 1 billion people every month around the world.

Google Maps began as a C++ desktop program developed by brothers Lars and Jens Rasmussen at Where 2 Technologies. In October 2004, the company was acquired by Google, which converted it into a web application. After additional acquisitions of a geospatial data visualization company and a real-time traffic analyzer, Google Maps was launched in February 2005. The service's front end utilizes JavaScript, XML, and Ajax. Google Maps offers an API that allows maps to be embedded on third-party websites, and offers a locator for businesses and other organizations in numerous countries around the world. Google Map Maker allowed users to collaboratively expand and update the service's mapping worldwide but was discontinued from March 2017. However, crowdsourced contributions to Google Maps were not discontinued as the company announced those features would be transferred to the Google Local Guides program.

Much of the available satellite imagery is no more than three years old and is updated on a regular basis, according to a 2011 report. Google Maps previously used a variant of the Mercator projection, and therefore could not accurately show areas around the poles. In August 2018, the desktop version of Google Maps was updated to show a 3D globe. It is still possible to switch back to the 2D map in the settings.

Google Maps for Android and iOS devices was released in September 2008 and features GPS turn-by-turn navigation along with dedicated parking assistance features. By 2013, it was found to be the world's most popular smartphone app, with over 54% of global smartphone owners using it. In 2017, the app was reported to have 2 billion users on Android, along with several other Google services including YouTube, Chrome, Gmail, Search, and Google Play.

History

Acquisitions 
Google Maps first started as a C++ program designed by two Danish brothers, Lars and Jens Eilstrup Rasmussen, and Noel Gordon and Stephen Ma, at Sydney-based Where 2 Technologies. It was first designed to be separately downloaded by users, but the company later pitched the idea for a purely Web-based product to Google management, changing the method of distribution. In October 2004, the company was acquired by Google Inc. where it transformed into the web application Google Maps.

In the same month, Google acquired Keyhole, a geospatial data visualization company (with investment from the CIA), whose marquee application suite, Earth Viewer, emerged as the highly successful Google Earth application in 2005 while other aspects of its core technology were integrated into Google Maps. In September 2004, Google acquired ZipDash, a company that provided realtime traffic analysis.

2005–2010 

The launch of Google Maps was first announced on the Google Blog on February 8, 2005.

In September 2005, in the aftermath of Hurricane Katrina, Google Maps quickly updated its satellite imagery of New Orleans to allow users to view the extent of the flooding in various parts of that city.

As of 2007, Google Maps is equipped with a miniature view with a draggable rectangle that denotes the area shown in the main viewport, and "Info windows" for previewing details about locations on maps.

On November 28, 2007, Google Maps for Mobile 2.0 was released. It featured a beta version of a "My Location" feature, which uses the GPS / Assisted GPS location of the mobile device, if available, supplemented by determining the nearest wireless networks and cell sites. The software looks up the location of the cell site using a database of known wireless networks and sites. By triangulating the different signal strengths from cell transmitters and then using their location property (retrieved from the database), My Location determines the user's current location.

On September 23, 2008, coinciding with the announcement of the first commercial Android device, Google announced that a Google Maps app had been released for its Android operating system.

In October 2009, Google replaced Tele Atlas as their primary supplier of geospatial data in the US version of Maps and used their own data.

2011–2015 
On April 19, 2011, Map Maker was added to the American version of Google Maps, allowing any viewer to edit and add changes to Google Maps. This provides Google with local map updates almost in real-time instead of waiting for digital map data companies to release more infrequent updates.

On January 31, 2012, Google, due to offering its Maps for free, was found guilty of abusing the dominant position of its Google Maps application and ordered by a court to pay a fine and damages to Bottin Cartographer, a French mapping company. This ruling was overturned on appeal.

In June 2012, Google started mapping the UK's rivers and canals in partnership with the Canal and River Trust. The company has stated that “it would update the program during the year to allow users to plan trips which include locks, bridges and towpaths along the 2,000 miles of river paths in the UK.”

In December 2012, the Google Maps application was separately made available in the App Store, after Apple removed it from its default installation of the mobile operating system version iOS 6 in September 2012.

On January 29, 2013, Google Maps was updated to include a map of North Korea. , Google Maps recognizes Palestine as a country, instead of redirecting to the Palestinian territories.

In August 2013, Google Maps removed the Wikipedia Layer, which provided links to Wikipedia content about locations shown in Google Maps using Wikipedia geocodes.

On April 12, 2014, Google Maps was updated to reflect the annexation of Ukrainian Crimea by Russia. Crimea is shown as the Republic of Crimea in Russia and as the Autonomous Republic of Crimea in Ukraine. All other versions show a dotted disputed border.

In April 2015, on a map near the Pakistani city of Rawalpindi, the imagery of the Android logo urinating on the Apple logo was added via Map Maker and appeared on Google Maps. The vandalism was soon removed and Google publicly apologized. However, as a result, Google disabled user moderation on Map Maker, and on May 12, disabled editing worldwide until it could devise a new policy for approving edits and avoiding vandalism.

On April 29, 2015, users of the classic Google Maps were forwarded to the new Google Maps with the option to be removed from the interface.

On July 14, 2015, the Chinese name for Scarborough Shoal was removed after a petition from the Philippines was posted on Change.org.

2016–2018 

On June 27, 2016, Google rolled out new satellite imagery worldwide sourced from Landsat 8, comprising over 700 trillion pixels of new data. In September 2016, Google Maps acquired mapping analytics startup Urban Engines.

In 2016, the Government of South Korea offered Google conditional access to the country's geographic database – access that already allows indigenous Korean mapping providers high-detail maps. Google declined the offer, as it was unwilling to accept restrictions on reducing the quality around locations the South Korean Government felt were sensitive.

On October 16, 2017, Google Maps was updated with accessible imagery of several planets and moons such as Titan, Mercury, and Venus, as well as direct access to imagery of the Moon and Mars.

In May 2018, Google announced major changes to the API structure starting June 11, 2018. This change consolidated the 18 different endpoints into three services and merged the basic and premium plans into one pay-as-you-go plan.  This meant a 1400% price raise for users on the basic plan, with only six weeks of notice.  This caused a harsh reaction within the developers community.  In June, Google postponed the change date to July 16, 2018.

In August 2018, Google Maps designed its overall view (when zoomed out completely) into a 3D globe dropping the Mercator projection that projected the planet onto a flat surface.

2019–present 

In January 2019, Google Maps added speed trap and speed camera alerts as reported by other users.

On October 17, 2019, Google Maps was updated to include incident reporting, resembling a functionality in Waze which was acquired by Google in 2013.

In December 2019, Incognito mode was added, allowing users to enter destinations without saving entries to their Google accounts.

In February 2020, Maps received a 15th anniversary redesign. It notably added a brand-new app icon, which now resembles the original icon in 2005.

On September 23, 2020, Google announced a COVID-19 Layer update for Google maps, which is designed to offer a seven-day average data of the total COVID-19-positive cases per 100,000 people in the area selected on the map. It also features a label indicating the rise and fall in the number of cases.

In January 2021, Google announced that it would be launching a new feature displaying COVID-19 vaccination sites.

In January 2021 Google announced updates to the route planner that would accommodate drivers of electric vehicles. Routing would take into account the type of vehicle, vehicle status including current charge, and the locations of charging stations.

In June 2022, Google Maps added a layer displaying air quality for certain countries.

Functionality

Directions and transit 
Google Maps provides a route planner, allowing users to find available directions through driving, public transportation, walking, or biking. Google has partnered globally with over 800 public transportation providers to adopt GTFS (General Transit Feed Specification), making the data available to third parties. The app can indicate users' transit route, thanks to an October 2019 update. The incognito mode, eyes-free walking navigation features were released earlier. A July 2020 update provided bike share routes.

Traffic conditions 

In 2007, Google began offering traffic data as a colored overlay on top of roads and motorways to represent the speed of vehicles on particular roads. Crowdsourcing is used to obtain the GPS-determined locations of a large number of cellphone users, from which live traffic maps are produced.

Google has stated that the speed and location information it collects to calculate traffic conditions is anonymous. Options available in each phone's settings allow users not to share information about their location with Google Maps. Google stated, "Once you disable or opt out of My Location, Maps will not continue to send radio information back to Google servers to determine your handset's approximate location".

Street View 

 On May 25, 2007, Google released Google Street View, a feature of Google Maps providing 360° panoramic street-level views of various locations. On the date of release, the feature only included five cities in the U.S. It has since expanded to thousands of locations around the world. In July 2009, Google began mapping college campuses and surrounding paths and trails.

Street View garnered much controversy after its release because of privacy concerns about the uncensored nature of the panoramic photographs, although the views are only taken on public streets. Since then, Google has blurred faces and license plates through automated facial recognition.

In late 2014, Google launched Google Underwater Street View, including  of the Australian Great Barrier Reef in 3D. The images are taken by special cameras which turn 360 degrees and take shots every 3 seconds.

In 2017, in both Google Maps and Google Earth, Street View navigation of the International Space Station interior spaces became available.

Immersive View 
It was announced at the Google I/O 2022 event that 3D images would be created using Street View. It was to be initially in five cities worldwide, with plans to add it to other cities later on.

Immersive View was to be available initially in the following locations:

Landmark Icons 
Google added icons of city attractions like on Apple Maps on October 3, 2019. In the first stage, such icons were added to 9 cities.

Landmark Icons was to be available initially in the following locations:

45° imagery 

In December 2009, Google introduced a new view consisting of 45° angle aerial imagery, offering a "bird's-eye view" of cities. The first cities available were San Jose and San Diego. This feature was initially available only to developers via the Google Maps API. In February 2010, it was introduced as an experimental feature in Google Maps Labs. In July 2010, 45° imagery was made available in Google Maps in select cities in South Africa, the United States, Germany and Italy.

Business listings 
Google collates business listings from multiple on-line and off-line sources. To reduce duplication in the index, Google's algorithm combines listings automatically based on address, phone number, or geocode, but sometimes information for separate businesses will be inadvertently merged with each other, resulting in listings inaccurately incorporating elements from multiple businesses. Google allows business owners to create and verify their own business data through Google Business Profile, formerly Google My Business. Owners are encouraged to provide Google with Business information including; address, phone number, business category and photos. Google has staff in India who check and correct listings remotely as well as support businesses with issues. Google also has teams on the ground in most countries, that validate physical addresses in person. After the business listing has been verified, business owners can further optimize their profile by logging into their Google account and GMB dashboard. In mid-August 2020 Google made it more convenient for business owners to edit their business profile directly from search, simply by typing the word My business or their company name. Google Business Profile, formerly Google My Business allows businesses to create a website for free.

Google Maps can be manipulated by businesses which are not physically located in the area in which they record a listing. There are cases of people abusing Google Maps to overtake their competition by placing unverified listings on online directory sites knowing the information will roll across to Google (duplicate sites). The people who update these listings do not use a registered business name. Keywords and location details are placed on their Google Maps business title which can overtake credible business listings. In Australia in particular, genuine companies and businesses are noticing a trend of fake business listings in a variety of industries.

Genuine business owners can also optimize their business listings to gain greater visibility in Google Maps, through a type of search engine marketing called local search engine optimization.

Indoor maps 
In March 2011, indoor maps were added to Google Maps, giving users the ability to navigate themselves within buildings such as airports, museums, shopping malls, big-box stores, universities, transit stations, and other public spaces (including underground facilities). Google encourages owners of public facilities to submit floor plans of their buildings in order to add them to the service. Map users can view different floors of a building or subway station by clicking on a level selector that is displayed near any structures which are mapped on multiple levels.

My Maps 

My Maps is a feature in Google Maps launched in April 2007 that enables users to create custom maps for personal use or sharing. Users can add points, lines, shapes, notes and images on top of Google Maps using a WYSIWYG editor. An Android app for My Maps, initially released in March 2013 under the name Google Maps Engine Lite, was available until its removal from the Play Store in October 2021.

Google Local Guides 
Google Local Guides is a volunteer program launched by Google Maps to enable its users to contribute to Google Maps when registered.  Sometimes, it provides them additional perks and benefits for the work.  Users can achieve Level 1 to 10, and be awarded with badges.  The program is partially a successor to Google Map Maker as features from the former program became integrated into the website and app. 

The program consists of adding reviews, photos, basic information, and videos; and correcting information such as wheelchair accessibility.Adding reviews, photos, videos, new places, new roads or providing useful information gives points to the users. The level of users is upgraded when they get a certain amount of points. Starting with Level 4, a star is shown near the avatar of the user.

Timelapse 
Earth Timelapse, released in April 2021, is a program in which users can see how the earth has been changed in the last 37 years. They combined the 15 million satellite images (roughly ten quadrillion pixels) to create the 35 global cloud-free Images for this program.

Implementation 

As the user drags the map, the grid squares are downloaded from the server and inserted into the page. When a user searches for a business, the results are downloaded in the background for insertion into the side panel and map; the page is not reloaded. A hidden iframe with form submission is used because it preserves browser history. Like many other Google web applications, Google Maps uses JavaScript extensively. The site also uses JSON for data transfer rather than XML, for performance reasons.

The version of Google Street View for classic Google Maps required Adobe Flash. In October 2011, Google announced MapsGL, a WebGL version of Maps with better renderings and smoother transitions. Indoor maps use JPG, .PNG, .PDF, .BMP, or .GIF, for floor plans.

Users who are logged into a Google Account can save locations so that they are overlaid on the map with various colored "pins" whenever they browse the application. These "Saved places" can be organized into default groups or user named groups and shared with other users.  "Starred places" is one default group example. It previously automatically created a record within the now-discontinued product Google Bookmarks.

Map data and imagery 
The Google Maps terms and conditions state that usage of material from Google Maps is regulated by Google Terms of Service and some additional restrictions. Google has either purchased local map data from established companies, or has entered into lease agreements to use copyrighted map data. The owner of the copyright is listed at the bottom of zoomed maps. For example, street maps in Japan are leased from Zenrin. Street maps in China are leased from AutoNavi. Russian street maps are leased from Geocentre Consulting and Tele Atlas. Data for North Korea is sourced from the companion project Google Map Maker.

Street map overlays, in some areas, may not match up precisely with the corresponding satellite images. The street data may be entirely erroneous, or simply out of date: "The biggest challenge is the currency of data, the authenticity of data," said Google Earth representative Brian McClendon. As a result, in March 2008 Google added a feature to edit the locations of houses and businesses.

Restrictions have been placed on Google Maps through the apparent censoring of locations deemed potential security threats. In some cases the area of redaction is for specific buildings, but in other cases, such as Washington, D.C., the restriction is to use outdated imagery.

Google Maps API 
Google Maps API, now called Google Maps Platform, hosts about 17 different APIs, which are themed under the following categories: Maps, Places and Routes.

After the success of reverse-engineered mashups such as chicagocrime.org and housingmaps.com, Google launched the Google Maps API in June 2005 to allow developers to integrate Google Maps into their websites. It was a free service that didn't require an API key until June 2018 (changes went into effect on July 16), when it was announced that an API key linked to a Google Cloud account with billing enabled would be required to access the API. The API  does not contain ads, but Google states in their terms of use that they reserve the right to display ads in the future.

By using the Google Maps API, it is possible to embed Google Maps into an external website, onto which site-specific data can be overlaid. Although initially only a JavaScript API, the Maps API was expanded to include an API for Adobe Flash applications (but this has been deprecated), a service for retrieving static map images, and web services for performing geocoding, generating driving directions, and obtaining elevation profiles. Over 1,000,000 web sites use the Google Maps API, making it the most heavily used web application development API. In September 2011, Google announced it would deprecate the Google Maps API for Flash.

The Google Maps API was free for commercial use, provided that the site on which it is being used is publicly accessible and did not charge for access, and was not generating more than 25,000 map accesses a day. Sites that did not meet these requirements could purchase the Google Maps API for Business.

As of June 21, 2018, Google increased the prices of the Maps API and requires a billing profile.

Google Maps in China 
Due to restrictions on geographic data in China, Google Maps must partner with a Chinese digital map provider in order to legally show Chinese map data. Since 2006, this partner has been AutoNavi.

Within China, the State Council mandates that all maps of China use the GCJ-02 coordinate system, which is offset from the WGS-84 system used in most of the world. google.cn/maps (formerly Google Ditu) uses the GCJ-02 system for both its street maps and satellite imagery. google.com/maps also uses GCJ-02 data for the street map, but uses WGS-84 coordinates for satellite imagery, causing the so-called China GPS shift problem.

Frontier alignments also present some differences between google.cn/maps and google.com/maps. On the latter, sections of the Chinese border with India and Pakistan are shown with dotted lines, indicating areas or frontiers in dispute. However, google.cn shows the Chinese frontier strictly according to Chinese claims with no dotted lines indicating the border with India and Pakistan. For example, the South Tibet region claimed by China but administered by India as a large part of Arunachal Pradesh is shown inside the Chinese frontier by google.cn, with Indian highways ending abruptly at the Chinese claim line. Google.cn also shows Taiwan and the South China Sea Islands as part of China. Google Ditu's street map coverage of Taiwan no longer omits major state organs, such as the Presidential Palace, the five Yuans, and the Supreme Court.

Feature-wise, google.cn/maps does not feature My Maps. On the other hand, while google.cn displays virtually all text in Chinese, google.com/maps displays most text (user-selectable real text as well as those on map) in English. This behavior of displaying English text is not consistent but intermittent – sometimes it is in English, sometimes it is in Chinese. The criteria for choosing which language is displayed are not known publicly.

Criticism and controversies

Incorrect location naming 
There are cases where Google Maps had added out-of-date neighborhood monikers (In Los Angeles, the name "Brooklyn Heights" was revived from its 1870s usage  and "Silver Lake Heights" from its 1920s usage)  or mistakenly renamed areas (in Detroit, the neighborhood "Fiskhorn" became "Fishkorn").Because many companies utilize Google Maps data, these previously obscure or incorrect names then gain traction; the names are often used by realtors, hotels, food delivery sites, dating sites, and news organizations. 

Google has said it created its maps from third-party data, public sources, satellites, and users, but many names used have not been connected to any official record. According a former Google Maps employee (who was not authorized to speak publicly), users can submit changes to Google Maps, but,  some submissions are ruled upon by people with little local knowledge of a place, such as contractors in India. Critics maintain that names likes "BoCoCa" (for the area in Brooklyn between Boerum Hill, Cobble Hill and Carroll Gardens), are "just plain puzzling" or simply made up. Some names used by Google have been traced to non-professionally made maps with typographical errors that survived on Google Maps.

Potential misuse 

In 2005 the Australian Nuclear Science and Technology Organisation (ANSTO) complained about the potential for terrorists to use the satellite images in planning attacks, with specific reference to the Lucas Heights nuclear reactor; however, the Australian Federal government did not support the organization's concern. At the time of the ANSTO complaint, Google had colored over some areas for security (mostly in the U.S.), such as the rooftop of the White House and several other Washington, D.C. buildings.

In October 2010, Nicaraguan military commander Edén Pastora stationed Nicaraguan troops on the Isla Calero (in the delta of the San Juan River), justifying his action on the border delineation given by Google Maps. Google has since updated its data which it found to be incorrect.

On January 27, 2014, documents leaked by Edward Snowden revealed that the NSA and the GCHQ intercepted Google Maps queries made on smartphones, and used them to locate the users making these queries. One leaked document, dating to 2008, stated that "[i]t effectively means that anyone using Google Maps on a smartphone is working in support of a GCHQ system."

In May 2015, searches on Google Maps for offensive racial epithets for African Americans such as "nigger", "nigger king", and "nigger house" pointed the user to the White House; Google apologized for the incident.

In February 2020, a Google Maps user used 99 cell phones to fake a Google Maps traffic jam.

Discontinued features

Google Latitude 

Google Latitude was a feature that let users share their physical locations with other people. This service was based on Google Maps, specifically on mobile devices. There was an iGoogle widget for desktops and laptops as well. Some concerns were expressed about the privacy issues raised by the use of the service. On August 9, 2013, this service was discontinued, and on March 22, 2017, Google incorporated the features from Latitude into the Google Maps app.

Google Map Maker 

In areas where Google Map Maker was available, for example, much of Asia, Africa, Latin America and Europe as well as the United States and Canada, anyone who logged into their Google account could directly improve the map by fixing incorrect driving directions, adding biking trails, or adding a missing building or road. General map errors in Australia, Austria, Belgium, Denmark, France, Liechtenstein, Netherlands, New Zealand, Norway, South Africa, Switzerland, and the United States could be reported using the Report a Problem link in Google Maps and would be updated by Google. For areas where Google used Tele Atlas data, map errors could be reported using Tele Atlas map insight.

If imagery was missing, outdated, misaligned, or generally incorrect, one could notify Google through their contact request form.

In November 2016, Google announced the discontinuation of Google Map Maker as of March 2017.

Mobile app 

Google Maps is available as a mobile app for the Android and iOS mobile operating systems. The Android app was first released in September 2008, though the GPS-localization feature had been in testing on cellphones since 2007. Up until iOS 6, the built-in maps application on the iOS operating system was powered by Google Maps. However, with the announcement of iOS 6 in June 2012, Apple announced that they had created their own Apple Maps mapping service, which officially replaced Google Maps when iOS 6 was released on September 19, 2012. However, at launch, Apple Maps received significant criticism from users due to inaccuracies, errors and bugs. One day later, The Guardian reported that Google was preparing its own Google Maps app, which was released on December 12, 2012. Within only two days, the application had been downloaded over ten million times.

Features 
The Google Maps apps for iOS and Android have many of the same features, including turn-by-turn navigation, street view, and public transit information. Turn-by-turn navigation was originally announced by Google as a separate beta testing app exclusive to Android 2.0 devices in October 2009. The original standalone iOS version did not support the iPad, but tablet support was added with version 2.0 in July 2013. An update in June 2012 for Android devices added support for offline access to downloaded maps of certain regions, a feature that was eventually released for iOS devices, and made more robust on Android, in May 2014.

At the end of 2015 Google Maps announced its new offline functionality, but with various limitations – downloaded area cannot exceed 120,000 square kilometers and require a considerable amount of storage space. In January 2017, Google added a feature exclusively to Android that will, in some U.S. cities, indicate the level of difficulty in finding available parking spots, and on both Android and iOS, the app can, as of an April 2017 update, remember where users parked. In August 2017, Google Maps for Android was updated with new functionality to actively help the user in finding parking lots and garages close to a destination. In December 2017, Google added a new two-wheeler mode to its Android app, designed for users in India, allowing for more accessibility in traffic conditions. In 2019 the Android version introduced the new feature called live view that allows to view directions directly on the road thanks to augmented reality
 Google Maps won the 2020 Webby Award for Best User Interface in the category Apps, Mobile & Voice. In March 2021, Google added a feature in which users can draw missing roads. In June 2022, Google implemented support for toll calculation. Both iOS and Android apps report how much the user has to pay in tolls when a route that includes toll roads is input. The feature is available for roads in the USA, India, Japan and Indonesia with further expansion planned. As per reports the total number of toll roads covered in this phase is around 2000.

Reception 
USA Today welcomed the application back to iOS, saying: "The reemergence in the middle of the night of a Google Maps app for the iPhone is like the return of an old friend. Only your friend, who'd gone missing for three months, comes back looking better than ever." Jason Parker of CNET, calling it "the king of maps", said, "With its iOS Maps app, Google sets the standard for what mobile navigation should be and more." Bree Fowler of the Associated Press compared Google's and Apple's map applications, saying: "The one clear advantage that Apple has is style. Like Apple devices, the maps are clean and clear and have a fun, pretty element to them, especially in 3-D. But when it comes down to depth and information, Google still reigns superior and will no doubt be welcomed back by its fans." Gizmodo gave it a ranking of 4.5 stars, stating: "Maps Done Right". According to The New York Times, Google "admits that it's [iOS app is] even better than Google Maps for Android phones, which has accommodated its evolving feature set mainly by piling on menus".

Google Maps' location tracking is regarded by some as a threat to users' privacy, with Dylan Tweney of VentureBeat writing in August 2014 that "Google is probably logging your location, step by step, via Google Maps", and linked users to Google's location history map, which "lets you see the path you've traced for any given day that your smartphone has been running Google Maps". Tweney then provided instructions on how to disable location history. The history tracking was also noticed, and recommended disabled, by editors at CNET and TechCrunch. Additionally, Quartz reported in April 2014 that a "sneaky new privacy change" would have an effect on the majority of iOS users. The privacy change, an update to the Gmail iOS app that "now supports sign-in across Google iOS apps, including Maps, Drive, YouTube and Chrome", meant that Google would be able to identify users' actions across its different apps.

The Android version of the app surpassed 5 billion installations in March 2019. By November 2021, the Android app had surpassed 10 billion installations.

Go version 
Google Maps Go, a version of the app designed for lower-end devices, was released in beta in January 2018. By September 2018, the app had over 10 million installations.

Artistic and literary uses 
The German "geo-novel" Senghor on the Rocks (2008) told the story as a series of spreads showing a Google map location on the left and text telling the story on the right. Annika Richterich explains that the "satellite pictures in Senghor on the Rocks illustrate the main character’s travel through the West-African state of Senegal".

Artists have used Google StreetView in a range of ways. Emilio Vavarella's The Google Trilogy includes glitchy images and unintended portraits of the drivers of the Street View cars. The Japanese band group inou used Google StreetView backgrounds to make a music video for their song EYE. The US band Arcade Fire made a customized music video that used StreetView to show the viewer their own childhood home.

See also 

 Bing Maps
 Comparison of web map services
 GeoGuessr
 Google Maps Road Trip, live-streaming documentary
 OpenStreetMap
 Terravision (computer program)
 Wikiloc, a mashup that shows trails and waypoints on Google Maps
 Wikimapia, a mashup combining Google Maps and a wiki aimed at "describing the whole planet earth"
 Yandex Maps, popular in Russia and CIS

References

External links 

 
Official Google Maps blog
About Google Maps
Google Local Guides
Google Maps Platform

 
Alphabet Inc.
Android (operating system) software
BlackBerry software
Danish inventions
Maps
Maps
Transport companies established in 2005
Internet properties established in 2005
Maps
Java platform software
Keyhole Markup Language
Mobile route-planning software
Pocket PC software
Symbian software
Web Map Services
Web mapping
Windows Mobile Standard software